Hermeskeil is a Verbandsgemeinde ("collective municipality") in the district Trier-Saarburg, in Rhineland-Palatinate, Germany. The seat of the Verbandsgemeinde is in Hermeskeil.

The Verbandsgemeinde Hermeskeil consists of the following Ortsgemeinden ("local municipalities"):

Bescheid 
Beuren 
Damflos 
Geisfeld 
Grimburg 
Gusenburg 
Hermeskeil
Hinzert-Pölert 
Naurath (Wald) 
Neuhütten 
Rascheid 
Reinsfeld 
Züsch

Verbandsgemeinde in Rhineland-Palatinate